Will Payne (born 19 June 1989) is an English actor.

Will Payne grew up in Bath, Somerset, and is the younger brother of actor Tom Payne. He attended Kingswood School before going on to do a foundation year at the Royal Academy of Dramatic Art, graduating in 2009.

In 2012, he appeared in the feature film Elfie Hopkins, starring opposite Jaime Winstone and Ray Winstone. In the same year, he played George Harrison in the West End stage adaptation of Backbeat, directed by five time Tony Award nominee David Leveaux.

He was featured in Nylon Magazine's 2012 Young Hollywood Issue.

Payne played the role of Tony Travers in the ITV drama Mr Selfridge.

In 2015, Payne had a starring role (Johnny Valentine) in the world premiere of Teddy at the Southwark Playhouse.

Filmography
Film
Fright Night 2: New Blood (2013) Charley Brewster 
Mariah Mundi and the Midas Box (2013) 
Elfie Hopkins (2012) Elliot Gammon

Television
Mr Selfridge (2013) Tony Travers
Summer in Transylvania (2011) Rex

Theatre
 Backbeat (2012) George Harrison

References

External links

1989 births
Living people
Male actors from Bristol
English male film actors
English male television actors
Alumni of RADA
21st-century English male actors